The Commander of the Defence Force is the professional head of the Belize Defence Force. He is responsible for the administration and the operational control of the Belize Defence Force.

List of Chiefs

References

Military of Belize
Belize